is a Japanese footballer who plays as a midfielder for V-Varen Nagasaki.

Career 
Born in Fukuoka, Kato signed for Albirex Niigata in September 2009, joining them from the Mitsubishi Yowa Academy. He made his debut on 11 September 2010 in the J. League match against Gamba Osaka at the Big Swan, which Albirex lost 1–2.

He has represented the Japan national team at numerous youth levels.

Club statistics
Updated to end of 2018 season.

References

External links 
Profile at Albirex Niigata

 

1991 births
Living people
Association football people from Fukuoka Prefecture
Japanese footballers
Japan youth international footballers
J1 League players
J2 League players
Albirex Niigata players
Ehime FC players
Avispa Fukuoka players
V-Varen Nagasaki players
Association football midfielders